Bharhut is a village located in the Satna district of Madhya Pradesh, central India. It is known for its famous relics from a Buddhist stupa. What makes Bharhut panels unique is that each panel is explicitly labelled in Brahmi characters mentioning what the panel depicts. The major donor for the Bharhut stupa was King Dhanabhuti.

The Bharhut sculptures represent some of the earliest examples of Indian and Buddhist art, later than the monumental art of Ashoka (circa 260 BCE), and slightly later than the early Shunga-period reliefs on railings at Sanchi Stupa No.2 (starting circa 115 BCE). Though more provincial in quality than the sculpture at Sanchi, Amaravati Stupa and some other sites, a large amount of sculpture has survived, generally in good condition.  Recent authors date the reliefs of the railings of Bharhut circa 125–100 BCE, and clearly after Sanchi Stupa No.2, compared to which Bharhut has a much more developed iconography. The torana gateway was made slightly later than the railings, and is dated to 100–75 BCE. Historian Ajit Kumar gives a later date to Bharhut, the 1st century CE, based on stylistic comparisons with datable works of art from the Art of Mathura, particularly sculptures inscribed in the name of ruler Sodasa. Many of the Bharhut remains are now located in the Indian Museum in Kolkata, with others in museums in India and abroad.  Little remains at the site today.

Buddhism continued to survive in Bharhut until 12th century. A Small Buddhist temple was enlarged around 1100 AD and a new statue of Buddha was installed. A large Sanskrit inscription from the same period was found at the site, however it appears to have been lost. This is different from the inscription Lal Pahad inscription of AD 1158 mentioning the Kalachiri kings.

Some recent reevaluations have tended to uncouple Bharhut from the Shunga period, and rather attribute the stupa to the 1st century CE, based on artistic similarities with better dated Mathura art and a questioning of the antiquity of the Bharhut inscriptions (particularly the Dhanabhuti inscriptions) suggested by traditional paleography.

Bharhut stupa

Structure
 
The Bharhut stupa may have been first built by the Maurya king Ashoka in the 3rd century BCE, but many works of art, particularly the gateway and railings, were apparently added during the Shunga period, with many reliefs from the 2nd century BCE, or later. Alternatively, the sculptures made have been added during the reign of the Sughanas, a northern Buddhist kingdom.

The central stupa was surrounded by a stone railing and four Torana gates, in an arrangement similar to that of Sanchi. A large part of the railing has been recovered, but only one of the four torana gates remains. 

An epigraph on a pillar of the gateway of the stupa mentions its erection "during the rule of the Sugas by Vatsiputra Dhanabhuti". The expression used is "Suganam Raje", may mean "during the rule of the Shungas", although not without ambiguity as it could also be "during the rule of the Sughanas", a northern Buddhist kingdom. There is no other instance of the name "Shunga" in the epigraphical record of India. The inscription reads:

If the attribution is to be taken as "Shungas", since King Dhanabhuti was making a major dedication to a Buddhist monument, and on the contrary the Shungas are known to have been Hindu monarchs, it seems that Dhanabhuti himself was not a member of the Shunga dynasty. Neither is he known from Shunga regnal lists. His mention of "in the reign of the Shungas" also suggests that he was not himself a Shunga ruler, only that he may have been a tributary of the Shungas, or a ruler in a neighbouring territory, such as Kosala or Panchala.

Builders
 
Mason's marks in Kharosthi have been found on several elements of the Bharhut remains, indicating that some of the builders at least came from the north, particularly from Gandhara where the Kharoshti script was in use. Cunningham explained that the Kharosthi letters were found on the balustrades between the architraves of the gateway, but none on the railings which all had Indian markings, summarizing that the gateways, which are artistically more refined, must have been made by artists from the North, whereas the railings were made by local artists. 

According to some authors, Hellenistic sculptors had some connection with Bharhut and Sanchi as well. The structure as a whole as well as various elements point to Hellenistic and other foreign influence, such as the fluted bell, addorsed capital of the Persepolitan order, and the abundant use of the Hellenistic flame palmette or honeysuckle motif. Besides the origin of its contributors however, the gateway retains a very strong Indian character in its form.

It would seem the railings were the first elements to be built, circa 125–100 BCE. The great gateway was built later, circa 100–75 BCE. On artistic grounds, the decorations of the railings are considered later stylistically than those of Sanchi Stupa No.2, suggesting a date of circa 100 BCE for the reliefs of the railings, and a date of 75 BCE for the gateway.

Excavation

In 1873, Alexander Cunningham visited Bharhut. The next year, he excavated the site. Joseph David Beglar, Cunningham's assistant, continued the excavation and recorded the work through numerous photographs.

A pillar capital in Bharhut, dated to the 2nd century BCE during the Shunga Empire period, is an example of Bharhut architecture thought to incorporate Persian and Greek styles, with recumbent animal (in the style of the Pillars of Ashoka), and a central anta capital with many Hellenistic elements (rosettes, beads-and-reels), as well as a central palmette design, in a style similar to that of the Pataliputra capital.

The complex in Bharhut included a medieval temple (plate II), which contained a colossal figure of the Buddha, along with fragments of sculptures showing the Buddha with images of Brahma, Indra etc. Beglar also photographed a 10th-century Buddhist Sanskrit inscription, about which nothing is now known.

The ruined stupa—nothing but foundations of the main structure (see Gallery)—is still in Bharhut; however, the gateways and railings have been dismantled and reassembled at the Indian Museum, Kolkata. They contain numerous birth stories of the Buddha's previous lives, or Jataka tales. Many of them are in the shape of large, round medallions. Two of the panels are at the Freer Gallery of Art/Arthur M. Sackler Gallery in Washington. Some years ago a pre-Devanagari inscription, from the time of King Balaldev, was found on Bharhut mountain.

As representative of early Indian art

In conformity with the early aniconic phase of Buddhist art, the Buddha is only represented through symbols, such as the Dharma wheel, the Bodhi tree, an empty seat, footprints, or the triratana symbol.

The style represents the earliest phase of Indian art, and all characters are depicted wearing the Indian dhoti, except for one foreigner thought to be an Indo-Greek soldier, with Buddhist symbolism. The Bharhut carvings are slightly later than the Sanchi Stupa No.2 reliefs and the earlier Ajanta frescos.

An unusual feature of the Bharhut panels is the inclusion of text in the narrative panels, often identifying the individuals.

Inscriptions
The inscriptions found at Bharhut are of considerable significance in tracing the history of early Indian Buddhism and Buddhist art. 136 inscriptions mention the donors. These include individuals from Vidisha, Purika (a town somewhere in the Vindhya mountains), Pataliputra (Bihar), Karhad (Maharashtra), Bhojakata (Vidarbha, eastern Maharashtra), Kosambi (Uttar Pradesh), and Nasik (Maharashtra). 82 inscriptions serve as labels for panels depicting the Jatakas, the life of the Buddha, former Manushi Buddhas, other stories and Yakshas and Yakshinis.

Structure and details

Survival in 11-12th century

A Buddha sculpture datable to 11-12th century was also found, in addition to a Sanskrit inscription, belonging to a vihara structure. This demonstrates that Buddhism at the site survived well until 11-12th century, although nothing datable to the intervening period has been found.

Although the best known remains are from the 1st centuries BCE/CE, Bharhut, just as Sanchi, continued to be used as a Buddhist monastic center for more than a millennium.
But the monuments of Bharhut were ultimately destroyed and most of the remains were used by local villagers as building material.

Recently found Buddhist remains in region near Bharhut and Sanchi
Several minor Stupas and Buddhist statues have been discovered in the region near Sanchi and Bharhut dating up to 12th century CE. They demonstrate that Buddhism was widespread in this region and not just confined to Sanchi and Bharhut, and survived until 12th century, like the Sanchi complex itself, although greatly declining after 9-10th century. These include:
 Banshipur village, Damoh 
 Madighat in Rewa district
 Buddha Danda, Singrauli 
 Bilahri, Katni 
 Kuwarpur, Sagar Dist/Bansa Damoh Dist
 Damoh Museum Buddha
 Deur Kothar, Rewa
 Devgarh,  Lalitpur 
 Khajuraho (MUseum)
 Mahoba, 11-12th cent. sculptures

Gallery

See also
 Sanchi
 Deorkothar

References

External links

 Bharhut sculpture images
 Birth of classic form, BENOY K. BEHL, Frontline, Volume 24 - Issue 17 :: Aug. 25-Sep. 07, 2007,  covering the art of the Bharhut Stupa
 Life of the Historical Buddha on the Bharhut Railing
 Medallions from Barhut
 Railing at Indian Museum

Buildings and structures in Madhya Pradesh
Buddhist architecture
Buddhist pilgrimage sites in India
History of Madhya Pradesh
Stupas in India
Tourist attractions in Madhya Pradesh
Satna district
Archaeological sites in Madhya Pradesh
Buddhist sites in Madhya Pradesh
Indian Buddhist sculpture